Heibetnuma was an unprotected cruiser with a composite hull of the Ottoman Navy, laid down in 1881 at the Constantinople dockyard and completed in 1893. The ship had six rectangular boilers and carried about 280 tons of coal. The main armament was three Krupp 6.7in/25 caliber 5.6 ton breechloading guns, mounted fore and aft. The secondary guns were six Krupp 4.7in/25 BL guns in sponsons amidships.

This ship and the slightly smaller cruiser  were similar in armament and performance to the Miaoulis, an unprotected cruiser acquired in 1879 for the navy of the Ottoman Empire's main naval rival, Greece. The Russian Black Sea Fleet, another threat to the Ottoman navy, included the slightly larger unprotected cruiser .

References

Bibliography

Cruisers of the Ottoman Navy
Ships built in the Ottoman Empire
1881 ships